Ek Hi Bhool (The Only Mistake) is a 1940 Hindi social drama directed by Vijay Bhatt. The film was produced by Vijay and his brother Shankar Bhatt for Bhatt's production banner Prakash Pictures. The Music direction was by Shankar Rao Vyas with lyrics by Pandit Anuj.
The film starred P. Jairaj, Mehtab, Umakant, Baby Meena, Prahlad Dutt, Rekha and Baby Meena (Meena Kumari).

Cast 
 P. Jairaj
 Mehtab
 Umakant
 Amirbai Karnataki
 Takle
 Prahlad Dutt
 Meena Kumari
 Munshi Khanjar
 Rekha

Soundtrack 
Music was composed by Shankar Rao Vyas and the lyricist was Pandit Anuj.

Songlist

References

External links 
 

1940 films
1940s Hindi-language films
Films directed by Vijay Bhatt
Indian drama films
1940 drama films
Indian black-and-white films
Hindi-language drama films